Modesto station is a staffed Amtrak station in Modesto, California. It serves the on the San Joaquin line. Designed by Pacific Design Associates of Modesto and VBN Architects of Oakland, the $2.4 million depot was built on four acres of former dairy pastureland. The station has one platform which serves a single track.

Before November 12, 1999, trains stopped instead in Riverbank, about 4 miles north. In the past trains also stopped at the Modesto Transportation Center, which was built by the Southern Pacific Transportation Company in 1915, and in the future rail service will move there again when the Altamont Corridor Express begins service to Modesto.

Modesto is the point where the San Joaquin splits, with trains bound for the Bay Area continuing to Stockton's San Joaquin Street station and trains heading to Sacramento continuing to Stockton–Downtown station.

Station photos

References

External links 

Railway stations in Stanislaus County, California
Railway stations in the United States opened in 1999
Transportation in Modesto, California
Amtrak stations in California